Joshua Eagle (born 10 May 1973) is a former professional male tennis player and current professional tennis coach from Australia.

In January 2013 he was appointed as the Australian Davis Cup coach, having previously won Tennis Australia's elite coaching excellence award in 2012 for helping Australian Marinko Matosevic break into the top 50 from outside 200. He was born in Toowoomba, Queensland and now lives in Noosa, Queensland. He stands at 1.83 m and weighs 90 kg, and is classified as a doubles specialist. Eagle has won five ATP doubles titles.

Eagle is married to former professional tennis player Barbara Schett. They have a son who was born in 2009.

Junior Grand Slam finals

Doubles: 1 (1 title)

ATP career finals

Doubles: 24 (5 titles, 19 runner-ups)

ATP Challenger and ITF Futures finals

Doubles: 10 (7–3)

Performance timelines

Singles

Doubles

Mixed doubles

References

External links
 
 
 

1973 births
Living people
Australian male tennis players
Australian Open (tennis) junior champions
People from the Sunshine Coast, Queensland
Sportspeople from Toowoomba
Tennis people from Queensland
Grand Slam (tennis) champions in boys' doubles
Australian tennis coaches